KINL is a radio station based in Eagle Pass, Texas. The station broadcasts at 92.7 MHz with an ERP of 20,000 watts.

History
KINL signed on November 2, 1971 as the sister station to KEPS.

The station was sold by Rhattigan Broadcasting to MBM Radio Eagle Pass, a subsidiary of R Communications, in 2013.

On June 29, 2022, KINL ceased operations.

References

External links

INL